Kalloori Kalangal is a 2010 Indian Tamil language romantic drama film directed by Remoo Shiva. The film stars newcomer Sukumar and Priyanka Chandra, with L. Raja, Yuvarani, Dashrath Bhatt, Vanitha Krishnachandran, Manobala, Pandi, Dindigul I. Leoni, and Bayilvan Ranganathan playing supporting roles. The film had musical score by Rajesh Ramalingam and was released on 3 September 2010.

Plot

Santhosh (Sukumar) and Kavitha (Priyanka Chandra) are college mates and good friends. Santhosh then falls in love with Kavitha but is feared to tell her his love, so he professes his love to her through anonymous calls and messages. Thereafter, Kavitha finds out that the anonymous caller is none other than Santhosh and accepts his love. When Kavitha's parents Shankar (L. Raja) and Vasantha (Yuvarani) come to know about their love, they scold her and force her to forget him. The same day, the two lovers meet up and understand that they cannot get married with their parents' support, so they agree to commit suicide by drinking poison at 7:00 PM when the church bell will ring. The two lovers split up after a long farewell and go back to their house. At Santhosh's house, his parents (Dashrath Bhatt and Vanitha Krishnachandran) find that Santhosh is acting strangely, and they learn about his thought of committing suicide. At 6:40 P.M., they stop him from doing so and convince him to save Kavitha. Santhosh's parents go to Kavitha's house to warn her parents while Santhosh decides to stop the church bell from ringing. Santhosh's parents manage to warn Kavitha's parents at 6:55 P.M, but they cannot open Kavitha's bedroom door. In the meantime, Santhosh fails to stop the bell from ringing, and Kavitha drinks poison when the bell rang. At the hospital, Kavitha dies holding Santhosh's hand.

Cast

Production
Remoo Shiva made his directorial debut with Kalloori Kalangal based on college-based love story under the banner of Starting Point Cinema. Newcomer Sukumar signed to play the lead role while Kannada actress Priyanka Chandra was selected to play the heroines. T. Murugavel had cranked the camera and Rajesh Ramalingam scored the music. The director said, "The highlight of the film is going to be its story and presentation. The way hero expresses his love and how mobile phone comes handy will all be told in the film which will also have a different climax". The film was shot in Erode, Yercaud and Hyderabad.

Soundtrack

The film score and the soundtrack were composed by Rajesh Ramalingam. The soundtrack features 6 tracks.
The audio was released on 19 February 2010 in Chennai at AVM Studios. V. Sekhar and S. P. Muthuraman attended the audio function. S. R. Ashok Kumar of The Hindu said, "The songs of Kalloori Kalangal are passable". Indiaglitz wrote, "Almost all the rhythms of the songs are like they have been taken out of stock music. Something what is preinstalled in basic synthesizers or keyboards you get today. There is nothing new in any of the songs".

Release
The film was released on 3 September 2010 alongside five other films.

The New Indian Express stated, "A poorly crafted screenplay, weakly etched characters and badly guided performances make Kalloori Kalangal a test of patience".

References

2010 films
2010s Tamil-language films
2010 romantic drama films
Indian romantic drama films
Films shot in Hyderabad, India
2010 directorial debut films